Roth-Händle is a former tobacco manufacturing company based in Lahr, Germany. The brand is now managed by Reemtsma, a subsidiary of Imperial Tobacco since 2002.

History
Roth-Händle was launched in 1897 and has been registered since July 22, 1897, in the German register of trade marks. "Roth-Händle" cigarettes were referred to colloquially as "Lung torpedo", "Lung suppository", "Toth-Händle" or "Red death" due to its former strength. Today, it is forbidden to sell cigarettes in the European Union with an amount of tar, nicotine and carbon monoxide that is higher than 10 (tar), 1.0 (nicotine) or 10 (carbon monoxide) milligrams.

The fact that the cigarettes consist predominantly of dark tobacco and do not contain the now usual flavor additives is characteristic of the brand. Therefore, they were advertised in older advertisements as "all natural". Roth-Händle cigarettes contain mainly tobaccos from German production, including the "Geudertheimer".

The classic filterless version is best known. The variant "Roth-Händle filter" also existed up until October 2017. The cigarettes are sold in a "soft pack" and with a traditionally held black inscription on a red background (filter: white letters on a red background). Under the name "Roth-Händle", the red hand used on the packs is a registered trademark. A fine-cut tobacco is also available under the name "Black Hand", corresponding to the character of the Roth-Händle.

In 1991, the European Commission prohibited the then "heavy" cigarettes, containing a high amount of tar, nicotine and carbon monoxide. The ban was put in place to protect heavy smokers of the Reemtsma brands Roth-Händle, Reval, "West Strong" and "Astor". From 1993 onwards, the EC Council of Ministers announced in Brussels in mid-November that manufacturers in the countries of the European Union were only allowed to sell brands with a maximum of 15 milligrams of tar per cigarette. By 1998, the carcinogenic pollutant was eventually reduced to 12 milligrams.

In 1998, the variant "Roth-Händle Blond" was launched with a large advertising effort, aiming to introduce the brand (similar to the blond Gauloises) to new customers. This variant with light tobacco was eventually terminated due to lack of success. It was similar to a "light mix" (white pack).

Company 

The manufacturer of the "Roth-Händle" cigarettes was the "Badische Tabakmanufaktur" ("Baden Tobacco Manufacturer") Roth-Händle GmbH (BTM), which was founded in 1871 by Jules Schaller in Strasbourg. In 1920, after 50 years of production in Strasbourg, the factory was relocated to Lahr. At the end of the 1930s the families of Adler and Oppenheimer, which also owned the Adler & Oppenheimer leather company which was also stationed in Strasbourg, owned one third of the shares of Roth-Händle AG, which had since been converted into a stock corporation. The then capital stock was just under 2 million Reichsmark. With the active participation of the Deutsche Bank, the predominantly Jewish owners of the companies had been forced out due to the Nazi Party's plans of Aryanization of all German companies. The National Socialists were divided on tobacco consumption: While they tightened the protection of non-smokers, they saw the tobacco consumption as essential to the war to reassure the population. Joseph Goebbels therefore pleaded to postpone the "tobacco issue" until the end of the war. The cigarette manufacturer Johann Neusch from Herbolzheim bought 80% of the shares. A short time after, Roth-Händle AG then even bought the previously Jewish owned Alsatian tobacco manufactory from Strasbourg.

In 1957, Reemtsma became the majority owner of the company. In 1985, Reemtsma then eventually took over the company completely. The plant in Lahr was closed in March 2007. The BTM was one of the main buyers of tobacco leaves in South-Baden with approximately 275 employees and they produced mainly plug cigarettes until they found no demand due to the abolition of their tax advantage.

The production of the "Roth Händle" cigarettes already moved some time ago to other German Reemtsma factories (to Langenhagen or Wilmersdorf).

Markets 
Roth-Händle is mainly sold in Germany, but also in France, Italy, Hungary and the United States.

Products
 Roth-Händle Filterless
 Roth-Händle Blond

Below are all the current brands of Roth-Händle cigarettes sold, with the levels of tar, nicotine and carbon monoxide included.

See also

 Tobacco smoking

References

External links

 

Imperial Brands brands
German brands